Douglas Stott Parker (December 31, 1952 – October 4, 2022) was a professor of computer science at UCLA from 1979 to his retirement in 2016, specializing in Data Mining, Bioinformatics, Database Management, Scientific Data Management and Modeling.

Parker was an investigator in the UCLA Center for Computational Biology (an NIH NCBC center), the UCLA Center for Cognitive Phenomics (an NIH project), and works with Chris Lee on bioinformatics databases.

Biography
Parker was born in New Haven, Connecticut, to Haverly Hubert Parker and classics professor Douglass Stott Parker, Sr. He received the A.B. in Mathematics cum laude from Princeton University in 1974. He completed his M.S. and Ph.D. at the University of Illinois Urbana-Champaign in 1976 and 1978, respectively. Following a period of postdoctoral research at the Universite de Grenoble in France he joined the Faculty of the UCLA Computer Science Department in 1979.

References

Papers
 Parker’s academic site lists his papers, under Directories with research results.

External links
 UCLA Computer Science Department

1952 births
2022 deaths
Artificial intelligence researchers
University of Illinois Urbana-Champaign alumni
Princeton University alumni
University of California, Los Angeles faculty
People from New Haven, Connecticut